Ivan Albertovich Puni (also known as Jean Pougny; 20 February 1892 – 28 December 1956) was a Russian avant-garde artist (Suprematist, Cubo-Futurist).

Biography

Early life
Ivan Puni was born in Kuokkala (then Grand Duchy of Finland in the Russian Empire, now Repino in Russia) to a family of Italian origins. He was the grandson of an eminent Italian composer of ballet music, Cesare Pugni. His father, a cellist, insisted that he follow a military career, but Ivan instead decided to take private drawing lessons with Ilya Repin. By 1909, he had his own studio.

Career
Puni continued his formal training in Paris in 1910–11 at the Académie Julien and other schools, where he painted in a derivative fauviste style. Upon his return to Russia in 1912, he married fellow artist Kseniya Boguslavskaya, and met, and exhibited with, members of the St Petersburg avant-garde, including Kazimir Malevich and Vladimir Tatlin. He made a second trip to Paris in 1914, returning to St. Petersburg in 1915. At this point, he began painting in a Cubist style reminiscent of Juan Gris. In 1915, Puni, (Aleksandra Ekster, Liubov Popova, Ivan Kliun, Ksenia Boguslavskaya, Olga Rozanova, Nadezhda Udaltsova, Nina Genke and others) formed Supremus,  a group of artists dedicated to the promulgation of Suprematism, the abstract art movement founded by Malevich, and first exhibited at the 0,10 Exhibition. Malevich and Puni co-authored the Suprematist Manifesto, published in 1916, which proclaimed a new, abstract art for a new historical era.

Puni also organized the exhibitions Tramway 5 and 0.10, both held in St Petersburg in 1915, in which Malevich, Tatlin, Popova and others participated, and to which Puni contributed constructions, readymades, and paintings. In 1915-1916 Puni, together with other Suprematist artists, worked at Verbovka Village Folk Centre. In 1919, he taught at the Vitebsk Art School under Marc Chagall.

Years of Exile
Puni and his wife, Kseniya Boguslavskaya, emigrated from Russia in 1919, first to Finland, then in 1920 to Berlin, where the first exhibition consisting entirely of his work was held at the Galerie der Sturm. While in Berlin, Puni also designed costumes and sets for theatrical productions, and published a book criticising Suprematism.

Puni and Boguslavskaya relocated to Paris in 1924, where his style changed once again to a variant of Impressionism. In France, he signed his work as "Jean Pougny", in an effort to distance his new art practice from his previous one in Russia. In 1946, Puni/Pougny became a French citizen. He died in Paris in 1956.

Literature
 Berlinische Galerie, Museumspädagogischer Dienst Berlin (Hrsg.): Iwan Puni. Synthetischer Musiker. Berlin 1992, ISBN 3-87584-438-6
 Herman Berninger: Pougny. Jean Pougny (Iwan Puni) 1892–1956. Catalogue de l’Œuvre. E. Wasmuth Verlag, Tübingen 1972, ISBN 3-8030-3000-5
 Magdalena Nieslony: Bedingtheit der Malerei. Ivan Puni und die moderne Bildkritik. Berlin 2016, ISBN 978-3-7861-2764-2
 Herman Berninger, 0,10 Iwan Puni. Werke Aus Der Sammlung Herman Berninger, Zuerich, Und Fotografien Der Russischen Revolution Aus Der Sammlung Ruth Und Peter Herzog, Basel, 2003, ISBN 3-7165-1308-3
 W.E. Gröger, Galerie der Sturm, Iwan Puni, Petersburg, Gemälde, Aquarelle, Zeichnungen, Berlin, Februar 1921
 André Salmon, Galerie Barbazanges, Œuvres de J. Pougni et Aquarelles de Xana Bougouslavska, Paris, 18.–30. April 1925
 Galerie Jaques Bernheim, 30 Œuvres, Paris, 16.–30. April 1928
 Galerie Jeanne Castel, Iwan Puni, Vorwort von Paul Guillaume, Paris, Juni 1933
 Galerie Louis Carré, Iwan Puni, Paris, 5. Oktober – 20. Oktober 1943
 Galerie de France, Iwan Puni, Vorwort zum Katalog von Charles Estienne, Paris, 3.–31. Mai 1947
 Galerie Knoedler, Iwan Puni, New York, 26. März – 16. April, 1949
 Adams Gallery, Jean Pougny, Vorwort zum Katalog von Alexander Watts, London, 13. April – 12. Mai 1950
 Musée National d’Art Moderne, Rétrospective Pougny, Paris, 24. Januar – 23. Februar 1958
 Musée Toulouse - Lautrec, Rétrospective Pougny, Vorwort zum Katalog von Édouard Julien und R.V. Gindertael, Albi, 29. März – 30. April 1958

Exhibitions

St. Petersburg, Union de la jeunesse, 1911
Paris, Salon des Indépendants, 1914
St. Petersburg, Palais des Beaux Arts, Premiére Exposition Futuriste des Tableaux Tramway V, 1915
St. Petersburg, Galerie Dobytchine, Dernière Exposition Futuriste des Tableaux 0.10, 1915
Berlin, Galerie der Sturm, Iwan Puni, Petersburg, February, 215 Kunstwerke, 1921 
Düsseldorf, Erste Internationale Kunstausstellung, 1922
Berlin, Große Berliner Kunstausstellung, Sektion Novembergruppe, 1922
Paris, Salon de Tuileries, 1924
Paris, Salon d'Automne, 1924
Paris, Galerie Barbazanges, Œuvres de J. Pougni et Aquarelles de Xana Bougouslavska, 1925 
Brüssel, Palais des Beaux-Arts, Exposition Internationale, 1928
Paris, Galerie Jaques Bernheim, Pougny,1928
Paris, Galerie Jeanne Castel, Iwan Puni, Essay from Paul Guillaume, 1933, Einzelausstellung
Paris, Galerie Charpentier, Salon des Temps Présent, 1934
Paris, Galerie Bernheim Jeune, Exposition des Œuvres des candidates aux Prix Paul Guillaume, 1935
Paris, Exposition Internationale, 1937
Paris, Galerie Louis Carré, Pougny, 1943 
Paris, Musée National d'Art Moderne, Exposition Internationale d'Art Moderne organisée pas l'UNSECO, 1946
Paris, Musée de Luxembourg, L'Art francais contemporaine, 1946
Paris, Galerie de France, Pougny, preface from Charles Estienne, 1947
New York, M Knoedler & Co, Jean Pougny, 1949 
Paris, Musée National d'Art Moderne, Vente aux Enchéres de Tableaux Modernes, 1950
London, Adams Gallery, Jean Pougny, 1950
Nice, Gallery des Ponchettes, Les Peintres par Témoins de leur Temps, 1953
Turin, Galleria Civica d'Arte Moderna, Peintres d'Aujourd'hui France-Italie, Pougny est invité d'honneur, 1953
Paris, Palais du Louvre, La Demeure Joyeuse - Paul Marrot et ses Amis, 1953
London, Royal Academy, Les Peintres d'aujourd'hui d'Utrillo à Picasso, 1955
Aix-en-Provence, Pavillon de Vendôme, Collection d'un Amateur Parisien (Collection of Madame Marie Cuttoli), 1958
Albi, Musée Toulouse - Lautrec, Rétrospective Pougny, preface from Édouard Julien and R.V. Gindertael, 1958
Zürich, Kunsthaus, Rétrospective Pougny, 247 œuvres, preface from René Wehrli, Gotthard Jedlicka, Werner Weber und R. V. Gindertael, 1960
Amsterdam, Stedelijk Museum, Rétrospective Pougny, 222 œuvres, 1961
Paris, Palais du Louvre, Collections d'Expression Française, 1962
Turin, Galleria Civica d'Arte Moderna, Rétrospective Pougny, 297 œuvres, 1962
Baden-Baden, Staatliche Kunsthalle, Schrift und Bild, Exposition Internationale, 1963
Paris, Bibliothèque Nationale, Rétrospective Pougny, 1964
New York, Metropolitan Museum of Art, Russian Stage and Costume Designs for the Ballet, Opera and Theatre, 1967
London, Royal Academy of Arts, French Painting since 1900 from Private collections in France, 1969
Berlin, Haus am Waldsee, Rétrospective Pougny 100 œuvres, 1975
Leverkusen, Städtisches Museum Schloss Morsbroich, Rétrospective Pougny 100 œuvres, 1975
Venedig, Biennale di Venezia, Ambiente / Arte dal Futurismo alla Body Art, 1977
Paris, Centre Georges Pompidou, Paris - Berlin 1900-1933, Rapports et Contrastes, 1978
Edinburgh, Scottish National Gallery of Modern Art, Libertad Colour and Form: Russian Non-Objective Art 1915-1922, 1978
New York, Solomon R. Guggenheim Museum, The Planar Dimension Europe 1912-1932, 1979
Los Angeles, Los Angeles County Museum of Art, The Avant-Garde in Russia, 1910-1930, New Perspectives, 1980
Moscow, Galerie Tretiakov, Moscow - Paris, 1900–1930, 1981
Frankfurt, Schirn Kunsthalle, Die große Utopie, Die Russische und Sovjet Avantgarde 1915-1932, 1992
Basel, Kunstmuseum, TransForm, BildObjekt Skulptur im 20. Jahrhundert, 1992
Paris, Musée d'Art Moderne de la Ville de Paris, Rétrospective Pougny, 1993
Zürich, Kunsthaus, Chagall, Kandinsky, Malevich & Russian Avantgarde, 1999
Basel, Fondation Beyeler, Auf der Suche nach 0.10, 2015

See also
Natalia Goncharova
Mikhail Larionov

References

External links
 

1890s births
1956 deaths
20th-century Russian painters
Russian avant-garde
Russian artists
Russian people of Italian descent
Académie Julian alumni
Naturalized citizens of France
Russian designers
White Russian emigrants to France
Suprematism (art movement)
Emigrants from the Russian Empire to France